Sjors Paridaans (born 23 January 1986 in Eindhoven) is a Dutch retired professional footballer who played as a defender and current assistant coach of VV UNA.

He formerly played for Fortuna Sittard, FC Eindhoven and FC Emmen.

Career

Coaching career
After two seasons at VV UNA, Paridaans decided to retire at the end of the 2019-20 season, and was immediately appointed assistant coach of the club.

References

External links
 Voetbal International

1986 births
Living people
Dutch footballers
Dutch expatriate footballers
PSV Eindhoven players
Fortuna Sittard players
FC Emmen players
FC Eindhoven players
K. Berchem Sport players
KFC Turnhout players
VV UNA players
Eerste Divisie players
Derde Divisie players
Footballers from Eindhoven
Association football defenders
Dutch expatriate sportspeople in Belgium
Expatriate footballers in Belgium